Maryhill railway station is a railway station serving the Maryhill area of Glasgow, Scotland. It has two side platforms. Services are provided by ScotRail on behalf of Strathclyde Partnership for Transport.

Maryhill was previously the terminus for the eponymous line when it reopened by British Rail in 1993 - the original 1858 Glasgow, Dumbarton and Helensburgh Railway "Maryhill Park" station on the same site (also the junction for the former Kelvin Valley Railway and the Stobcross Railway to Partickhill & Queens Dock) had been closed back in October 1961 by the British Transport Commission although some workmen's trains continued until 1964 after which it was subsequently demolished.

This extension was built to remove the need for terminating services from Queen Street to run empty through to Knightswood North Junction near  in order to reverse before returning to Glasgow - a process that occupied the busy junction there for several minutes whilst the driver changed ends and crossed over from one track to the other.

Services 

With the timetable revision starting on 18 May 2014, a limited hourly Sunday service now operates on this route.

References

External links 

Railscot - Maryhill
Video footage of Maryhill Station

Railway stations in Glasgow
Former North British Railway stations
Railway stations in Great Britain opened in 1858
Railway stations in Great Britain closed in 1951
Railway stations in Great Britain opened in 1960
Railway stations in Great Britain closed in 1964
Railway stations in Great Britain opened in 1993
Reopened railway stations in Great Britain
SPT railway stations
Railway stations served by ScotRail
Maryhill